The Next Tetris is a puzzle video game in the Tetris series developed by Blue Planet Software. The game was originally released for the PlayStation by Hasbro Interactive on July 31, 1999. In 2000 a version for the Dreamcast which included online multiplayer called The Next Tetris: On-Line Edition was published by Crave Entertainment in the United States. The Dreamcast version was released in Europe the following year with online functionality removed. A version was also included with Toshiba-manufactured DVD players using the interactive Nuon technology.

Gameplay  
The game features two modes. "Classic Tetris" has gameplay fundamentally unchanged from the earliest in the series, and is only playable in single-player. 

In "The Next Tetris" mode the familiar tetromino pieces consist of different colored blocks called "multiminoes". If a block is multi-colored and placed with a gap below the piece, then the colored squares will separate and drop into the space below. This "cascading" feature allows players to drop blocks down after initially making a horizontal line disappear, allowing for larger combos. The Next Tetris mode is playable in single-player, two-player, and online in the North American Dreamcast release only.

Reception 
The Next Tetris received a score of 6.5/10 in IGN, while the Dreamcast version scored 8/10. Reviewing the latter, IGN Anthony Chau described the new cascading gameplay as "an interesting play mechanic" and praised the "industrial-like menu presentation" and  "trancy, dreamy melodies" of the soundtrack. Official Dreamcast Magazine's Alex Huhtala dismissed the game as "a poorly conceived and executed version of a classic", pointing to "sluggish controls" and "gameplay tweaks [compared to the original Tetris] that make it too easy". The Next Tetris mode was described as a "novel idea" by Ryan Davis of GameSpot but he argued that "instead of making players take on new strategies, it tends to encourage a barrage of sloppy bricklaying".

References

External links
 
 Gamespot review

1999 video games
2000 video games
Blue Planet Software games
Crave Entertainment games
Dreamcast games
Multiplayer and single-player video games
PlayStation (console) games
Tetris
Video games developed in the United States